Black Friday is the fifteenth novel in the CHERUB series by Robert Muchamore, and the third book of the Aramov series, the sequel series to the best-selling original CHERUB series, which was published between 2004 and 2010. This carries on from the series featuring long-standing central character James Adams. The series has a new central character called Ryan Sharma. The original CHERUB series was centered on James Choke, or James Adams (his CHERUB name), a child secret agent, and it follows his recruitment to his retirement. As the series progresses, it also involves his younger sister and his friends as they carry out missions worldwide. The Aramov series is centered on Ryan Sharma, a new agent. The book was released in September 2013.

CHERUB novels
2013 British novels
Hodder & Stoughton books